GHL may refer to:

 Ghulfan language
 Global Hockey League
 Glenohumeral ligaments
 Golden Horseshoe Junior Hockey League
 Greenhill & Co., a US investment bank, NYSE symbol
 Griffon Hoverwork, a UK hovercraft company